Suyama Kofun is a Kofun that is located in Kōryō, Nara of Japan. It is designated as a national Special Historic Site. It has a length of about 204 metres. As of 2000, it was one of a small handful of kofun tombs over 200 metres in length which were not administered by the Imperial Household Agency, as it is not thought to be directly connected to the Imperial line.

References

See also 

 List of Historic Sites of Japan (Nara)

Kofun
Special Historic Sites
History of Nara Prefecture